Edward Longstreet Bodin (August 5, 1894 – August 2, 1983) was a mystery writer and politician who founded the "Spiritual Party" as a platform to run for President of the United States in the 1952  presidential election.

Biography
Born in Watchung, New Jersey, not much is known about Bodin's early life or family. His father was a former Sussex Country judge, and he claimed to be family friends with Woodrow Wilson, a man who had a profound impact on his life.

Bodin served in France during WWI. He met his French wife Juliette in Toulon. They were married on June 24, 1919.

Bodin began his literary career by writing for Strange Stories magazine as "Lucifer" and Thrilling Mystery magazine as "Chakra". In the 1930s, he served as a literary agent and mentor to L. Ron Hubbard.

In 1953, he suggested that if Winston Churchill doublecrossed the United States, the atom bomb should be used to divert the Gulf Stream in order to freeze England.  He suggested the same thing two years later in Upper Purgatory, claiming to have received a letter from William E. Bergin, Adjutant General of the United States, treating the idea seriously (pages 17–18).

In 1956, Bodin was the president of the Bernarr MacFadden Foundation, worth about $5,000,000. That year he also provided the foreword to a book by Blanche A. Draper, the pastor of the Church of the Radiant Flame, a woman who worked as a psychic and medium.

In the late 1950s, Bodin wrote a monthly column for the metaphysical publication Orion Magazine.

He died in Erie, Pennsylvania at age 88.

Literary Career

Scare Me!
In 1940, Bodin began writing books, starting with Scare Me! In the book, he addressed ghosts, ectoplasm, demons, zombies, werewolves and other similar topics, as well as claiming to be a descendant of Jean Bodin.  In it, he thanked sixty-eight people, including Arthur J. Burks, Jack Dempsey, Ruth Lyons, Lowell Thomas, Nathaniel Schachner, Theodore Tinsley, F. Orlin Tremaine, Arthur Leo Zagat, William B. Ziff and L. Ron Hubbard.

Give Me Liberty
1946 would see Bodin publishing Give Me Liberty, a collection of poems framed as a dialogue between Bodin and his mentor, "Old Vagabond" in a sort of Socratic dialogue. Old Vagabond serves as a vector for Bodin to express his views, where he derides those who seek conflict based on class or race, champions both Robert E. Lee and Abraham Lincoln as true American heroes, and calls for a universal religious brotherhood regardless of faith. Old Vagabond frequently brings up the virtues of being a vagabond, extoling that Cain was the first vagabond, and although Tubalcain promoted brotherhood, Cain was not brought back into good until Christ, a vagabond as well, died on the cross. Old Vagabond consistently writes from a populist angle, decrying all forms of aristocracy as well as those who would use democracy as a farce. However, he also strikes at liberals who would sacrifice their nation or faith for politics, as a good vagabond is patriotic.

The figure of the vagabond is central to Give Me Liberty, and all good values are extolled as ones a "true vagabond" holds. Among these is the idea that your name should be short, hence why he went as Ed and not Edward.

Upper Purgatory
His 1955 novel Upper Purgatory covered such subjects as ESP, flying saucers, the afterlife, and the Shakespeare authorship question. In the book (which Bodin claims to be a non-fictional work), Bodin is present to a series of seances held by a WW2 veteran for his friend who perished in the conflict. During them, the ghost of the departed soldier imparts knowledge beyond average comprehension, such as the true number of planets being 12, with the first named Vulco. Bodin also mentions the death of FDR, calling it tragic.

Bibliography
 Scare me!: A symposium on ghosts and black magic (1940)
 "These Sensitive Writers" in Author & Journalist (May 1945), reprinted in Pulp Fictioneers: Adventures in the Storytelling Business edited by John Locke.
 Give Me Liberty (1946) (as Ed "Vagabond" Bodin)
 Spirit World magazine (1947-) (editor)
 First Century Faith (Be Thou Healed): For Health and Happy Home of Christian, Jew or Pagan  Better Books, New York, (1951)
 Upper Purgatory: A Fascinating Adventure in Extra Sensory Perception College Publishing Co., Daytona Beach, Florida (1955)
 The Radiant Flame by Blanche A. Draper College Publishing Co.,  Daytona Beach, Florida (1956) (foreword)
 "My Best Friends Are Ghosts" in Orion Magazine (March 1960)
 "Mystics Saint John, Daniel and Nostradamus" in Orion Magazine (February 1961)
 First century healing: (in your own home circle) (1962)
 Mystery History (1964)

References

1894 births
1983 deaths
20th-century American novelists
20th-century American male writers
American male novelists
American mystery writers
American spiritualists
Candidates in the 1952 United States presidential election
20th-century American politicians